Hintz may refer to:

Places
Hintz, Wisconsin, an unincorporated community in USA
Cluj-Napoca Hintz House, a historic building in Romania

People
Andrew Hintz (1963–2016), New Zealand cricketer
Gordon Hintz (born 1973), Democratic Party member of the Wisconsin State Assembly
Johannes Hintz (1898–1944), highly decorated Generalleutnant in the Luftwaffe during World War II
Joy Alice Hintz (1926–2009), American writer
Mathew Hintz (1976–2017), American painter
Miiko Hintz (born 1992), Finnish ice hockey player
Mike Hintz (born 1965),  former defensive back in the National Football League
Orton Sutherland Hintz (1907–1985), New Zealand journalist
Pat Hintz (1914–2004), American basketball player
Roope Hintz (born 1996), Finnish ice hockey player
Viktor Hintz (1888–1972), Finnish politician

Fictional characters
 Terry Hintz, a character in the 2014 video game Lisa: The Painful

See also 
Hint (disambiguation)
Hinz (disambiguation)
Hinz (surname)